Levenda is a rural locality (a village) in Lyakhovskoye Rural Settlement, Melenkovsky District, Vladimir Oblast, Russia. The population was 179 as of 2010. There are 3 streets.

Geography 
Levenda is located 12 km east of Melenki (the district's administrative centre) by road. Panovo is the nearest rural locality.

References 

Rural localities in Melenkovsky District
Melenkovsky Uyezd